Steven King (born 22 November 1978) is a former Australian rules footballer who played for the Geelong Football Club and St Kilda Football Club in the Australian Football League (AFL). He is currently serving as Senior Assistant Coach at the Gold Coast Suns Football Club.

AFL career

Geelong 

Debuting as a 17-year-old with Geelong in 1996, King was a gifted ruckman. He won All-Australian selection and won the Carji Greeves Medal in 2000 and again in 2002. He was captain of the club between 2003 and 2006. In 2005, King was hit by numerous injuries, which affected his form.

A moment of controversy occurred in King's career in the 2005 Elimination Final, when he accidentally kicked Melbourne's Jeff White in the head. Both men were contesting a boundary throw in, and it was knocked to the ground. King was the man in front, and when the ball bounced up to head height, he took a mighty swing at it with his right foot. He missed the ball completely, but connected with White's face, giving him injuries which have been described as "equivalent to those of a car accident victim," requiring White to have several plates and screws inserted.

Media commentators and fans were largely divided about whether King should have faced the tribunal for kicking, historically the most heavily penalised infringement whether accidental or intentional. Eventually, the Match Review Panel decided that he had no case to answer, and he was free to play in the semi-final against  the following week. Somewhat ironically, a hamstring injury in the third quarter of that game coincided with a Geelong collapse, and eventually defeat.

King fell out of favour in 2007, playing only a handful of AFL games and was dropped to the Victorian Football League (VFL) in favour of Brad Ottens and Mark Blake. In round 18, playing in the AFL when Ottens was rested, he took a mark over goal umpire Michael Hammond – an awkward half-speckie/half-collision which sent the umpire crashing to the ground; for the second time in his career, despite the AFL's generally strict application of the rule prohibiting contact with field umpires, King avoided tribunal action, with the Match Review Panel deeming that the goal umpire had contributed to the clash, due to the fact that he moved towards the ball as it began to fall.

King continued to perform strongly in the VFL, and played in the Cats' 2007 VFL premiership against Coburg on 23 September. Following weak finals performances by Mark Blake, King received a recall to the senior team for the AFL Grand Final, despite Blake having played more games during the season. King then participated in the Cats' 2007 AFL premiership win against Port Adelaide on 29 September, giving him his second premiership medallion within seven days.

St Kilda 

Following Mark Blake re-signing as the number two ruckman, King was offered a one-year contract on reduced pay, which he declined. Lacking space in their salary cap, Geelong then asked King to retire, but eventually traded him, along with Charlie Gardiner, to St Kilda for a sixth-round selection in the 2007 national draft.

King played in St Kilda's 2008 NAB Cup winning side – St Kilda's third pre-season cup win. He played 22 games in 2008 and carried St Kilda's ruck division with 408 hitouts.
King played in 16 of 22 matches in the 2009 season home and away rounds in which St Kilda qualified in first position for the 2009 finals, winning the club's third minor premiership. St Kilda qualified for the 2009 AFL Grand Final after qualifying and preliminary finals wins. King played in the grand final in which St Kilda were defeated by 12 points by his former club Geelong.

On 16 September 2010, King announced his retirement. He played six games for the year, but was being kept out by emerging ruckman, Ben McEvoy.

Coaching 
Upon retiring from playing, King shifted to coaching at St Kilda for the 2010 and 2011 Seasons. In 2011, King moved to the Western Bulldogs where he was a part of the coaching panel for the 2016 AFL Premiership win and the 2021 Grand Final side.

At the conclusion of the 2021 Season, King accepted a Senior Assistant Coaching role with the Gold Coast Suns.

Statistics

|- style="background-color: #EAEAEA"
! scope="row" style="text-align:center" | 1996
|
| 1 || 13 || 3 || 2 || 81 || 55 || 136 || 38 || 13 || 113 || 0.2 || 0.2 || 6.2 || 4.2 || 10.5 || 2.9 || 1.0 || 8.7
|-
! scope="row" style="text-align:center" | 1997
|
| 1 || 22 || 8 || 5 || 202 || 91 || 293 || 94 || 24 || 200 || 0.4 || 0.2 || 9.2 || 4.1 || 13.3 || 4.3 || 1.1 || 9.1
|- style="background-color: #EAEAEA"
! scope="row" style="text-align:center" | 1998
|
| 1 || 11 || 1 || 2 || 89 || 47 || 136 || 60 || 9 || 130 || 0.1 || 0.2 || 8.1 || 4.3 || 12.4 || 5.5 || 0.8 || 11.8
|-
! scope="row" style="text-align:center" | 1999
|
| 1 || 17 || 14 || 12 || 134 || 60 || 194 || 63 || 29 || 193 || 0.8 || 0.7 || 7.9 || 3.5 || 11.4 || 3.7 || 1.7 || 11.4
|- style="background-color: #EAEAEA"
! scope="row" style="text-align:center" | 2000
|
| 1 || 23 || 12 || 10 || 252 || 120 || 372 || 82 || 43 || 493 || 0.5 || 0.4 || 11.0 || 5.2 || 16.2 || 3.6 || 1.9 || 21.4
|-
! scope="row" style="text-align:center" | 2001
|
| 1 || 16 || 11 || 3 || 161 || 81 || 242 || 76 || 40 || 328 || 0.7 || 0.2 || 10.1 || 5.1 || 15.1 || 4.8 || 2.5 || 20.5
|- style="background-color: #EAEAEA"
! scope="row" style="text-align:center" | 2002
|
| 1 || 22 || 14 || 9 || 237 || 135 || 372 || 100 || 52 || 531 || 0.6 || 0.4 || 10.8 || 6.1 || 16.9 || 4.5 || 2.4 || 24.1
|-
! scope="row" style="text-align:center" | 2003
|
| 1 || 13 || 2 || 4 || 95 || 80 || 175 || 49 || 29 || 341 || 0.2 || 0.3 || 7.3 || 6.2 || 13.5 || 3.8 || 2.2 || 26.2
|- style="background-color: #EAEAEA"
! scope="row" style="text-align:center" | 2004
|
| 1 || 16 || 6 || 4 || 126 || 67 || 193 || 55 || 40 || 369 || 0.4 || 0.3 || 7.9 || 4.2 || 12.1 || 3.4 || 2.5 || 23.1
|-
! scope="row" style="text-align:center" | 2005
|
| 1 || 18 || 3 || 0 || 140 || 85 || 225 || 69 || 30 || 271 || 0.2 || 0.0 || 7.8 || 4.7 || 12.5 || 3.8 || 1.7 || 15.1
|- style="background-color: #EAEAEA"
! scope="row" style="text-align:center" | 2006
|
| 1 || 16 || 1 || 1 || 116 || 97 || 213 || 67 || 23 || 214 || 0.1 || 0.1 || 7.3 || 6.1 || 13.3 || 4.2 || 1.4 || 13.4
|-
! scope="row" style="text-align:center" | 2007
|
| 1 || 6 || 0 || 1 || 18 || 40 || 58 || 18 || 22 || 81 || 0.0 || 0.2 || 3.0 || 6.7 || 9.7 || 3.0 || 3.7 || 13.5
|- style="background-color: #EAEAEA"
! scope="row" style="text-align:center" | 2008
|
| 2 || 22 || 5 || 4 || 131 || 110 || 241 || 70 || 60 || 408 || 0.2 || 0.2 || 6.0 || 5.0 || 11.0 || 3.2 || 2.7 || 18.5
|-
! scope="row" style="text-align:center" | 2009
|
| 2 || 19 || 3 || 1 || 81 || 85 || 166 || 43 || 43 || 286 || 0.2 || 0.1 || 4.3 || 4.5 || 8.7 || 2.3 || 2.3 || 15.1
|- style="background-color: #EAEAEA"
! scope="row" style="text-align:center" | 2010
|
| 2 || 6 || 0 || 0 || 22 || 26 || 48 || 14 || 11 || 82 || 0.0 || 0.0 || 3.7 || 4.3 || 8.0 || 2.3 || 1.8 || 13.7
|- class="sortbottom"
! colspan=3| Career
! 240
! 83
! 58
! 1885
! 1179
! 3064
! 898
! 468
! 4040
! 0.3
! 0.2
! 7.9
! 4.9
! 12.8
! 3.7
! 2.0
! 16.8
|}

References

External links 

St Kilda Profile – Steven King

Geelong Football Club players
Geelong Football Club Premiership players
Geelong Football Club captains
St Kilda Football Club players
All-Australians (AFL)
Carji Greeves Medal winners
1978 births
Living people
Australian rules footballers from Victoria (Australia)
Murray Bushrangers players
Shepparton Football Club players
Australia international rules football team players
One-time VFL/AFL Premiership players
People from Shepparton